Feng Junyang (born 29 December 1998) is a Chinese swimmer. She competed in the women's 50 metre breaststroke event at the 2018 FINA World Swimming Championships (25 m), in Hangzhou, China.

References

1998 births
Living people
Chinese female breaststroke swimmers
Place of birth missing (living people)
Asian Games medalists in swimming
Asian Games bronze medalists for China
Medalists at the 2018 Asian Games
Swimmers at the 2018 Asian Games
21st-century Chinese women